Liu Chen (died December 263), the Prince of Beidi (北地王), was the fifth son of Liu Shan, the second ruler of the state of Shu Han during the Three Kingdoms period of China. Liu Chen opposed the plans of Qiao Zhou to surrender to the opposing force under general Deng Ai from the rival state of Cao Wei. Liu Chen attempted to convince his father to fight for the honour of Shu, so Liu Bei (the founder of Shu) could look upon him as a redeemed ruler of Shu. However, Liu Shan threw Liu Chen out of the court for this. He then went to Liu Bei's ancestral temple and killed his wife and children before committing suicide. 

Liu Chen is depicted in the Wu Shuang Pu (無雙譜, Table of Peerless Heroes) by Jin Guliang.

Liu Chen's story is reenacted in a play of the Yue opera.

See also
 Shu Han family trees
 Lists of people of the Three Kingdoms

Notes

References

 Chen, Shou (3rd century). Records of the Three Kingdoms (Sanguozhi).

 Pei, Songzhi (5th century). Annotations to Records of the Three Kingdoms (Sanguozhi zhu).

263 deaths
3rd-century births
Familicides
Legendary Chinese people
Murder–suicides in China
Shu Han imperial princes
Suicides in Shu Han
Year of birth unknown